The 1st Army Aviation Regiment "Antares" is an Italian Army regiment based at Viterbo Airport in Lazio. The regiment is part of the Italian army aviation and assigned to the Army Aviation Brigade. Formed in 1976 as heavy lift aviation unit the regiment has been equipped since its formation with CH-47 Chinook helicopters.

History 
On 1 August 1965 the I General Use Helicopters Unit was formed at Viterbo Airport. On 1 1 September 1972 the Medium Helicopters Unit was formed at the same airport. Both units were assigned to the Office of the Inspector of Army Light Aviation.

Formation 
During the 1975 Army reform the army reorganized its aviation units and for the first time created aviation units above battalion level. On 1 February 1976 the 1st Army Light Aviation Grouping "Antares" was formed at Viterbo Airport and was took command of the I General Use Helicopters Unit and the Medium Helicopters Unit. Both units were reorganized and grouping consisted after its formation of the following units:

  1st Army Light Aviation Grouping "Antares", at Viterbo Airport
 11th Medium Transport Helicopters Squadrons Group "Ercole" (former Medium Helicopters Unit)
 Command and Services Squadron
 111th Medium Transport Helicopters Squadron (CH-47C Chinook helicopters)
 112th Medium Transport Helicopters Squadron (CH-47C Chinook helicopters)
 12th Medium Transport Helicopters Squadrons Group "Gru" (formed 12 October 1977)
 Command and Services Squadron
 121st Medium Transport Helicopters Squadron (CH-47C Chinook helicopters)
 122nd Medium Transport Helicopters Squadron (CH-47C Chinook helicopters)
 51st Multirole Helicopters Squadrons Group "Leone" (former I General Use Helicopters Unit)
 Command and Services Squadron
 511th Multirole Helicopters Squadron (AB 204B/205 helicopters)
 512th Multirole Helicopters Squadron (AB 204B/205 helicopters)
 513th Multirole Helicopters Squadron (AB 204B/205 helicopters)
 514th Multirole Helicopters Squadron (AB 204B/205 helicopters)
 Aircraft Efficiency Group

In total the grouping fielded 24 CH-47C Chinook helicopters and 24 AB 204B/205 helicopters.

Naming 
Since the 1975 Army reform Italian army aviation units are named for celestial objects: regiments are numbered with a single digit and named for stars in the 88 modern constellationss. Accordingly, an army aviation regiment's coat of arms highlights the name-giving star within its constellation. Squadron groups were numbered with two digits and named for constellations, or planets of the Solar System. The 1st Army Light Aviation Grouping was named for Antares the brightest star in the Scorpius constellation. When the army raised army aviation support regiments in 1996 they were named in relation to the regiment they supported, and therefore the 1st Antares' support regiment was named 4th Army Aviation Support Regiment "Scorpione". 

On 14 March 1977 the grouping was granted its flag by decree 173 of the President of the Italian Republic Giovanni Leone. Since then one Military Order of Italy for the regiment's service with the United Nations Transition Assistance Group in Namibia and the United Nations Interim Force in Lebanon, one Military Order of Italy for the regiment's international operations between 1991 and 2016, one Silver Medal of Army Valour for the regiment's service after the 1980 Irpinia earthquake, and one Silver Cross of Army Merit for the regiment's service with the United Nations Operation in Somalia I and the United Nations Operation in Somalia II, have been awarded to the regiment and attached to its flag.

Recent History 

On 25 June 1979 the grouping formed the ITALAIR Squadron in Naqoura in Lebanon as asset of the United Nations Interim Force in Lebanon. On 1 September 1981 the 12th Medium Transport Helicopters Squadrons Group "Gru" was disbanded and its personnel and materiel integrated into the 11th Medium Transport Helicopters Squadrons Group "Ercole". On 5 October 1991 the grouping was renamed 1st Army Light Aviation Regiment "Antares" and on 12 June 1993 1st Army Aviation Regiment "Antares". On 29 November 1993 the regiment formed the Liaison and Light Transport Planes Squadron (ACTL Squadron) with Dornier 228-212 planes.

On 1 October 1999 the ACTL Squadron was transferred from the 1st Army Aviation Regiment "Antares" to the Army Aviation Center's 28th Squadrons Group "Tucano". On the same date the Tucano moved from Rome Urbe Airport to Viterbo Airport and integrated the Army Aviation Center's Liaison and Regional Transport Planes Squadron (ACTR Squadron) with P180E Avanti II planes. On the same date the ITALAIR Squadron was transferred from the 1st Army Aviation Regiment "Antares" to the Army Aviation Command. The same year the 39th Squadrons Group "Drago" based at Alghero–Fertilia Airport in Sardinia was disbanded and its personnel and materiel transferred to Viterbo Airport, where they were used to form the Medium Helicopters Squadron. The squadron was equipped with AB-412A helicopters and assigned to the 1st Antares.

The 1st Army Aviation Regiment "Antares" consisted now of the following units:

  1st Army Aviation Regiment "Antares", at Viterbo Airport
 11th Squadrons Group "Ercole"
 Command and Services Squadron
 111th Medium Transport Helicopters Squadron (CH-47C Chinook helicopters)
 112th Medium Transport Helicopters Squadron (CH-47C Chinook helicopters)
 51st Multirole Helicopters Squadrons Group "Leone"
 Command and Services Squadron
 511th Medium Transport Helicopters Squadron (CH-47C Chinook helicopters)
 512th Medium Transport Helicopters Squadron (CH-47C Chinook helicopters)
 Support Squadrons Group
 Logistic Support Squadron
 Maintenance Squadron
 Medium Helicopters Squadron (AB-412A helicopters, former 39th Squadrons Group "Drago")

On 1 September 2001 the 26th Squadrons Group "Giove" based at Pisa Air Base was transferred from the Paratroopers Brigade "Folgore" to the 1st Army Aviation Regiment "Antares". The same year the Antares entered the Air Cavalry Grouping, which on 1 March 2006 became the Army Aviation Brigade. On 4 November 2002 the 26th Squadrons Group "Giove", 51st Squadrons Group "Leone", and Medium Helicopters Squadron were merged and formed the 26th Air Cavalry Squadrons Group "Giove" - Special Operations Helicopters Unit ( - REOS). The Giove maintained a detachment at Pisa-San Giusto Air Base equipped with AB 205 helicopters.

On 24 June 2013 the 28th Tucano joined the regiment, while on 10 November 2014 the 26th Giove left the regiment to form the 3rd Special Operations Helicopter Regiment "Aldebaran".

Current Structure 
As of 2022 the 1st Army Aviation Regiment "Antares" consists of:

  1st Army Aviation Regiment "Antares", at Viterbo Airport
 Headquarters Unit
 11th Squadrons Group "Ercole"
 111th Medium Transport Helicopters Squadron
 112th Medium Transport Helicopters Squadron
 28th Squadrons Group "Tucano", at Viterbo Airport (Lazio)
 Regional Transport and Liaison Planes Squadron, with P180 Avanti II planes
 Light Transport and Liaison Planes Squadron, with Dornier 228-212 planes
 UAV squadron, with RQ-7 Shadow 200 drones
 Support Squadrons Group
 Logistic Support Squadron
 Maintenance Squadron

Equipment 
The 11th Squadrons Group "Ercole" is equipped with 16x CH-47F Chinook transport helicopters.

See also 
 Army Aviation

External links
 Italian Army Website: 1° Reggimento Aviazione dell'Esercito "Antares"

References

Army Aviation Regiments of Italy